Zdunje is a village in the municipality of Gostivar, North Macedonia.

History
According to the 1467-68 Ottoman defter, Zdunje appears as being largely inhabited by an Orthodox Christian Albanian population. Due to Slavicisation, some families had a mixed Slav-Albanian anthroponomy - usually a Slavic first name and an Albanian last name or last names with Albanian patronyms and Slavic suffixes. 

The names are: Gjorgji Arbanas; Mill, son of Doksa; Daba, of his brother; Mano Arbanas (t. Arnaut); Ggjin Protogjer.

Demographics
As of the 2021 census, Zdunje had 1,140 residents with the following ethnic composition:
Albanians 730
Turks 532
Macedonians 77
Persons from whom data are taken from administrative sources 70
Others 1

According to the 2002 census, the village is multiethnical with a total of 2140 inhabitants. Ethnic groups in the village include:

Albanians 998
Turks 659
Macedonians 467
Romani 9
Serbs 1 
Others 9

References

External links

Villages in Gostivar Municipality
Albanian communities in North Macedonia